Destined to Love You is a 2015 Chinese television series created by Tong Hua. It stars Joe Chen, Jia Nailiang and Bosco Wong. The series aired on Hunan TV from 16 June to 11 July 2015.

Synopsis
The story is set in the 1916s and revolves around Qian Baobao, a normal civilian. In order to earn money to help her sick mother, she became an instructor at Longcheng Military Academy under a stolen identity. The stolen identity is Xiao Han, who has already died from an accident while studying for her doctorate overseas. Originally, Qian Baobao only wanted to stay at the military academy until her mother no longer needs treatment but somehow, she became entangled in an inextricable love triangle. The two men making up this love triangle are Xiang Hao and Shen Wentao. Shen Wentao is passionately pursuing Bao Bao and Xiang Hao is Xiao Han’s fiance. In order to conceal her real identity, Bao Bao has to evade the growing feelings between her and Xiang Hao as well as dispel Shen Wentao’s suspicions and temptations. In the middle of all this, a major crisis emerges when it turns out Xiao Han didn’t really die. Xiao Han’s return causes Qian Baobao to examine her conscience.

Cast

Main

Supporting

Students

Instructors and school staff

Others

Special appearance

Soundtrack

Ratings

Awards and nominations

References

External links

Chinese romantic comedy television series
Chinese period television series
Chinese action television series
2015 Chinese television series debuts